Thomas Bryan may refer to:

Thomas Bryan (VC) (1882–1945), English recipient of the Victoria Cross
Thomas Bryan (Chief Justice) (died 1500), British justice
Thomas Bryan (courtier) (died 1518), English courtier during the reign of Henry VIII
Thomas Bryan (Irish republican) (1897–1921), member of the Irish Republican Army
Luke Bryan (Thomas Luther Bryan, born 1976), American country singer
Thomas Bryan Martin (1731–1798), early American jurist, legislator, and prominent landowner
Thomas Bryan (English footballer) (1873–?), English footballer
Thomas Bryan (Welsh footballer) (1866–?), Welsh international footballer
Thomas Barbour Bryan (1828–1906), American businessman, lawyer, and politician

See also
Bryan Thomas (disambiguation)